This is a list of the butterflies of the family Riodinidae which are found in Sri Lanka. It is part of List of butterflies of Sri Lanka

One species only.

Species

References
Bernard d'Abrera (1986) Butterflies of the Oriental Region. Part 3: Lycaenidae and Riodinidae Hill House Publishers 
D'Abrera, B.L. (1998) The Butterflies of Ceylon. Hill House: Melbourne; London. 224 pp. 

Lists of butterflies of Sri Lanka
Riodinidae